A fish decoy is an object in the shape of a fish or some other animal that is used as a decoy to attract fish. It is often used during ice fishing. Unlike a fishing lure, a fish decoy doesn't have a hook.  

Fish were a common type of American folk art during the Depression era.

In fishing 
Fish decoys can be used to attract predator fish but also sturgeons.

Fish decoys are primarily used when ice fishing with spears, although fish decoys have been employed during "normal" (non-ice) fishing to attract fish to where a fisherman may have placed several baited lines.  Most common forms of fish decoys are weighted and attached to a line.  The line is often attached to the roof of the shanty, some other stationary object, or a jigging stick.  The fisherman will then "swim" or "dangle" the decoy to attract a fish in close enough to spear.

Another form of decoy that is sometimes used is called a "floater".  This type of fish decoy is not weighted, but is attached to a weight that holds the decoy at the desired depth.

There are other fish decoys which have one or more hooks attached.  In Minnesota, and some other states, these decoys are illegal and are referred to as "cheaters".  In Michigan, a hooked decoy is legal and is simply counted as one of the number of lines that each angler is allowed to employ.  These decoys are used since some species of fish, such as pike, are very aggressive and will attack the decoy.  The application of hooks provides an additional method to ensure the catch.

Fish decoy carving dates back to the time of Native Americans who would often carve decoys out of wood,  bone, or antlers.  They would lie out on the ice and use the decoys to attract a fish.  Modern ice fishermen will often use an ice shanty, which is sometimes also called a darkhouse or fish house, to protect themselves from the elements while fishing.

Folk art 
In modern times, fish decoys have been carved and collected for their artistry.  Fish decoys are now considered a form of folk art and have garnered a growing following in recent decades.  Many decoy carvers have also carved items to be used in decorating—such as plaques, vases, paddles, and carvings of other animals.

Among notable 20th century fish decoy artists are Gordon Charbeneau, Abe De Hate Sr, Gordon "Pecore" Fox,  Hans Janner Sr., David Forton, Yock Meldrom, Larry Joseph Peltier, Oscar W. Peterson, William Jesse Ramey, Tom Schroeder, Harry Seymore, Andy Trombley, and Ted Van DeBossche. These carvers (and numerous others) are considered vintage master carvers because their work predates the modern "collector" phase of fish decoys.  Their carvings were primarily intended as tools to aid the fisherman in harvesting fish.

References

Further reading
 The Fish Decoy (1986). Art, Brad & Scott Kimball.

External links 
Minnesota Conservation Volunteer Magazine
Great Lakes Fish Decoy Association
Michigan Darkhouse Angling Association
The Minnesota Darkhouse and Angling Association
National Fish Decoy Association
Texas World Fish Decoy Carving Championship
 Wayside Chapel listing of fish carvers by region: Michigan, Minnesota, New York, Wisconsin, Canada, Other

Fishing techniques and methods
Decorative arts
Folk art